Joseph Forman (November 18, 1929 – December 9, 1982) was an American comedian and comic actor.

Biography
Born in Philadelphia, Pennsylvania Forman appeared on the late 1940s local radio show the Magic Lady Supper Club along with his school friend, singer Eddie Fisher. The pair travelled to upstate New York to the Grossinger's Catskill Resort Hotel in the Catskill Mountains.  Forman was originally an athletic director, but his funny remarks led the management to place him on the stage as a comedian, though Forman wished to become a serious actor. Forman broke into show business after winning an Arthur Godfrey's Talent Scouts program.

He first attracted attention in Las Vegas as the opening act for Mickey Rooney and also Rooney's straight man. He also co-starred in Mickey Rooney's 1954–1955 NBC sitcom The Mickey Rooney Show: Hey, Mulligan, as Mickey's best friend, Freddy, and appeared with him in the films Andy Hardy Comes Home (1958) and The Big Operator (1959). He guest-starred in an unaired 1963 episode of the situation comedy Don't Call Me Charlie!.

Forman was considered a standard Borscht Belt comic, and he performed standup comedy both live and on television (including shows like The Hollywood Palace). He also took on comedic roles in films and on television. Forman appeared in two episodes of The Monkees, first as jealous kids show host "Captain Crocodile" in an eponymous episode, then as Asian criminal "Dragonman" in "Monkees Chow Mein". He also appeared in three Get Smart episodes, including two episodes as "Harry Hoo", a parody of Charlie Chan. He also appeared in the final episode of the first season of M*A*S*H as a touring comedian performing for U.S. troops in the Korean War as well as in Episode #18 during the third season of Bewitched as Ho Ho the Clown. He also had roles in films such as the Jerry Lewis film The Errand Boy (1961) as an audio director, The Wheeler Dealers (1963) starring James Garner and Lee Remick, The Wicked Dreams of Paula Schultz (1968), the cult film Candy (1968) as a tough New York cop, and Linda Lovelace for President (1975).

Forman distinguished himself from the field by inventing a character called "The Mashuganishi Yogi", a parody of the Maharishi Mahesh Yogi. In 1968, working with Bill Dana, he produced a comedy album consisting of a faux press conference, in which he responded to mostly-straight questions with funny answers, speaking in a stereotyped Indian accent. He was accompanied with a sitarist, "Harvey Shankar", a parody of Ravi Shankar (played by Dana).

Later years/death
In later television appearances, he would sometimes reprise his Yogi character. Forman died on December 9, 1982, from pulmonary fibrosis.

Filmography

References

External links
 

1929 births
1982 deaths
Male actors from Philadelphia
American male comedians
American male television actors
American male film actors
American male stage actors
Deaths from pulmonary fibrosis
20th-century American comedians
20th-century American male actors